Fritz von Friedl (1901–1971) was an Austrian cinematographer. He worked frequently on newsreels and documentary, including many during the Second World War for the Wehrmacht.

He is the father of the actor Fritz von Friedl and actress Loni von Friedl. He is the grandfather of actor Christoph von Friedl.

Selected filmography
 Ninety Minute Stopover (1936)
 The Impossible Mister Pitt (1938)
 Men, Animals and Sensations (1938)
 Vom Mädchen zur Frau (1950)
 The Last Reserves (1953)
 The Red Prince (1954)
 Goetz von Berlichingen (1955)

References

Bibliography 
 Fritsche, Maria. Homemade Men in Postwar Austrian Cinema: Nationhood, Genre and Masculinity. Berghahn Books, 2013.

External links 
 

1901 births
1971 deaths
Austrian cinematographers
People from Písek
German Bohemian people
Austrian people of German Bohemian descent